Matson may refer to:

Matson (surname)
Matson, Gloucester, England, a suburb of Gloucester
Matson, Missouri, an unincorporated community
2586 Matson, an asteroid
Matson, Inc., a shipping company, formerly Matson Navigation Company
Matson Films, American film distributor

See also
Mattson